Listed below are each of the active sports leagues in Minor League Baseball, with linked articles containing rosters for each active team in the league.

As with nearly all North American professional team sports, there are limits to the roster sizes of minor-league teams, which vary by classification level. Major League Baseball-affiliated teams are limited in how many players they may place on their active rosters, except for some "rookie" leagues. At lower classification levels, there are restrictions on how much prior professional experience players on the roster may have.

While a team's active roster consists of players eligible to compete for the team in games, a team's reserve roster consists of players on the injured list, those who are restricted or suspended, or who are otherwise temporarily inactive. Major league players on rehabilitation assignments do not count against active roster limits.

As of the 2021 season, the following limits are used:

Triple-A

International League

 International League rosters

Pacific Coast League

 Pacific Coast League rosters

Double-A

Eastern League

 Eastern League rosters

Southern League

 Southern League rosters

Texas League

 Texas League rosters

High-A

Midwest League

 Midwest League rosters

Northwest League

 Northwest League rosters

South Atlantic League

 South Atlantic League rosters

Single-A

California League

 California League rosters

Carolina League

 Carolina League rosters

Florida State League

 Florida State League rosters

Rookie

Arizona Complex League

 Arizona Complex League rosters

Dominican Summer League

 Dominican Summer League rosters

Florida Complex League

 Florida Complex League rosters

Offseason leagues

Arizona Fall League

Arizona Fall League rosters

See also
Major League Baseball rosters
Major League Baseball transactions

References

External links
 The official website of Minor League Baseball